Henry Wilson Withers (September 10, 1884 – June 15, 1949) was an American gymnast who was the head coach of the William & Mary Tribe men's basketball team in 1906–07. He led the team to a 1–4 record, the exact opposite of their inaugural 4–1 campaign. 

Withers was also William & Mary's head football coach in 1906, finishing 2–6.

Withers died of a heart attack in 1949. At the time of his death, he was working as a hardware merchant in Abingdon.

Head coaching record

Football

Basketball

References

1884 births
1949 deaths
American men's basketball coaches
Basketball coaches from North Carolina
Hardware merchants
Washington and Lee University alumni
William & Mary Tribe athletic directors
William & Mary Tribe football coaches
William & Mary Tribe men's basketball coaches
People from Lee County, North Carolina